Kola Gar Sara (also Romanized as Kolā Gar Sarā) is a village in Emamzadeh Abdollah Rural District, Dehferi District, Fereydunkenar County, Mazandaran Province, Iran. At the 2006 census, its population was 450, in 118 families.

References 

Populated places in Fereydunkenar County